Dorchester Cape is an unincorporated community in Westmorland County, New Brunswick. The community is situated in Southeastern New Brunswick, to the east of Moncton.

History

Notable people

See also
List of communities in New Brunswick

Bordering communities

References

Communities in Westmorland County, New Brunswick